Wayne Ferreira was the defending champion but lost in the first round to Marc-Kevin Goellner.

Ctislav Doseděl won in the final 6–4, 4–6, 6–3 against Carlos Moyá.

Seeds

Draw

Finals

Top half

Bottom half

References
 Singles draw

1996 ATP Tour
1996 BMW Open